Ilkhom Sharipov  is a former Uzbekistan football Defender  and football coach.

Career
Sharipov played the most of his career in Pakhtakor. He also played for Uzbekistan in the 1996 Asian Cup.

Managing career
In March 2016 Sharipov was appointed as head coach of Dinamo Samarqand which had been relegated to the First League during the 2015 Uzbek League season.

Honours

Club
 Uzbek League (3): 1992, 1996, 2001
 Uzbek League runner-up (1): 1993
 Uzbek Cup (1): 1993
 Uzbekistan Super Cup (1): 1999

International
 Asian Games (1): 1994

Individual
 Shuhrat medal (Medal of Honor)

External links

11v11 Profile

Uzbekistani footballers
Uzbekistani expatriate footballers
Uzbekistan international footballers
1996 AFC Asian Cup players
Living people
1968 births
People from Namangan Region
Soviet footballers
Asian Games gold medalists for Uzbekistan
Asian Games medalists in football
Association football defenders
Footballers at the 1994 Asian Games
Medalists at the 1994 Asian Games
Pakhtakor Tashkent FK players
FK Dinamo Samarqand players
FC Kyzylzhar players
FC Dustlik players
Expatriate footballers in Kazakhstan
Uzbekistani expatriate sportspeople in Kazakhstan